Ronn Sutton (born December 17, 1952) is a Canadian illustrator and comic book artist that has drawn several hundred comic books over the past four decades. This includes a nine-year stint illustrating nearly 50 issues of Elvira, Mistress of the Dark for Claypool Comics from 1998 to 2006.

Ronn's comics career began in 1973 with his artwork appearing in issues of the Canadian newsstand comic ORB Magazine, as well as anonymously penciling and inking many pages of Howard Chaykin's Sword of Sorcery for DC Comics (although he hid his initials drawn into a sword handle in issue #3, page 23). Over the decades he has drawn for a variety of publishers that have included Vortex Comics, Renegade Press, Northstar, Brainstorm, Draculina, Caliber Comics, Millennium Publications, Claypool Comics, Dark Horse Comics, Moonstone Books and more. Ronn has drawn issues of The Man From U.N.C.L.E., Cases of Sherlock Holmes, Vampira, Draculina, Fear Agent, The Phantom, Honey West and many others.

In 2015, Motorbooks published the 96 page graphic novel Lucifers Sword M.C.: Life and Death in an Outlaw Motorcycle Club, scripted by Hells Angel Phil Cross and illustrated by Sutton. As well, that same year saw publication of the true military comic Victims of War, written by Colonel Pat Stogran and illustrated by Sutton, about PTSD and other difficulties suffered by veterans who had served in Afghanistan.

Sutton has done extensive magazine illustration for Maclean's, Canadian Business, Saturday Night (magazine), Owl (magazine), National Post, etc., as well as providing freelance courtroom sketches for seven years for TV and newspapers. Ronn has worked periodically in animation (The Savage Dragon (TV series), Rescue Heroes (TV series)), provided over 90 on-screen drawings for true crime television series Natural Born Outlaws, and was nominated thirteen times between 1997 and 2009 for the Prix Aurora Award, the Canadian science fiction award for Artistic Achievement].

Ronn Sutton has often collaborated with writer Janet Hetherington on a variety of published comics since the early 1990s.

Beginning March 10, 2018, Edgar Rice Burroughs Inc launched an online weekly comic strip adaptation of the Burroughs novella "The Man-Eater", written by Martin Powell, drawn by Ronn Sutton and coloured by Becka Kinzie as a regular ongoing feature.

References

External links
 Official website
  CBC Radio Interview with Ronn Sutton and Phil Cross
 Ronn Sutton at Lambiek's Comiclopedia
 Pop Culture Addict Interview
 Ottawa Metro Interview
 Graphic Policy Interview
 Comic Book Credits at the Grand Comics Database

Living people
1952 births
Canadian illustrators
Canadian comics artists